Practice theory (or praxeology, theory of social practices) is a body of social theory within anthropology and sociology that explains society and culture as the result of structure and individual agency. Practice theory emerged in the late 20th century and was first outlined in the work of the French sociologist, Pierre Bourdieu.

Practice theory developed in reaction to the Structuralist school of thought, developed by social scientists such Claude Lévi-Strauss who saw human behavior and organization systems as products of innate universal structures that reflect the mental structures of humans. Structuralist theory asserted that these structures governed all human societies.

Practice theory is also built on the concept of agency. For practice theorists, the individual agent is an active participant in the formation and reproduction of their social world.

History

In 1972, French theorist and sociologist, Pierre Bourdieu, published Outline of a Theory of Practice. Bourdieu's theory of practice emerged from his ethnographic field work in French occupied Algeria among the Kabyle at the outbreak of the Algerian War of Independence. The original goal of his work in Algeria was to understand the Algerian culture and its internal laws in the effort to understand the conflict. His aim was to find the underlying rules and laws in Kabyle society. Bourdieu later rejected the idea that culture and social life can be reduced to the acting out of rules and the primacy of social structures over the individual. Instead, Bourdieu argues, culture and society are more fully understood as the product of dynamic interactions between social actors and structure. Anthony Giddens and Michel de Certeau, who also wrote on practice theory in the late 1970's and 1980's, laid the foundation for the body of theory along with Bourdieu.

Premise

Bourdieu's theory of practice sets up a relationship between structure and the habitus and practice of the individual agent, dealing with the "relationship between the objective structures and the cognitive and motivating structures which they produce and which tend to reproduce them". What is perceived and experienced as culture is the result of dynamic interaction of internal and external structures, individual performance (practice), and strategy (strategy is based on existing structures, but it exists from the actions of individuals seeking to pursue their own interests). According to practice theory, social actors are not just shaped by their social world, they in turn shape it as well. Since Bourdieu, sociologists, anthropologists, and feminist scholars, among others, have expanded on practice theory. The main ideas of practice theory are summarized below:

Practice theory involves structure, which Bourdieu describes as the "objective structures are themselves products of historical practices and are constantly reproduced and transformed by historical practices whose productive principle is itself the product of the structures which it consequently tends to reproduce." The two central terms to practice theory are practice, "what people do", or an individual's performance carried out in everyday life. The other key idea for practice is Habitus which is "a structuring structure, which organizes practices and the perception of practices" (Bourdieu, P. 1984: 170). Bourdieu coins the term habitus to refer to patterns of thought and behavior which are the deeply internalized structures. Habitus is composed of social conventions, rules, and values etc. that guide our everyday practice. These mental structures are representations of the external social structures people are in interaction with on a daily basis. These internal structures inform our practice and give meaning to our world. This deeply embedded mental order is what drives us to behave in accordance with social and cultural conventions. Habitus is also influenced by external individual forces, such as confronting a new social norm, or a new way of doing things. Like structure, habitus is also the product of historical events.

The embodied component of the habitus is the Hexis. It is manifested as an individual's gait, gesture, postures, accent etc. A closely related notion to Bourdieu's habitus is Michel Foucault's concept of 'discipline'. Like habitus, discipline 'is structure and power that have been impressed on the body forming permanent dispositions'. In contrast to Bourdieu, though, Foucault laid particular emphasis on the violence through which modern regimes (e.g. prisons and asylums) are used as a form of social control.

Another important concept to practice theory are doxa, which is the internalized societal or field-specific presuppositions that 'go without saying' and are not up for negotiation. The doxa is a constructed vision of reality so naturalized that it appears to be the only vision of reality learned, fundamental, deep-founded, unconscious beliefs, and values, taken as self-evident universals, that inform an agent's actions and thoughts within a particular field, e.g. 365 days, 24hrs, 60 seconds. The field represents a structured social space with its own rules, schemes of domination, legitimate opinions. Bourdieu uses the concept of field instead of analyzing societies solely in terms of classes. For example, fields in modern societies include arts, education, politics, law and economy. Cultural capital is also part of practice theory and is directly related to strategy. It is the intangible assets that enable actors to mobilize cultural authority/power as part of strategy e.g., e.g., competencies, education, intellect, style of speech, dress, social networks,. This is important in terms of an individual's strategy. A later addition to practice theory is structuration, coined by Anthony Giddens.

Practice Theory in Anthropology and Sociology

Cultural anthropologist Sherry Ortner defines practice theory as, "a theory of history. It is a theory of how social beings, with their diverse motives and their diverse intentions, make and transform in which they live." Ortner developed what she terms "cultural schemas" to explain society's structural contradictions and agency. Her engagement with practice theory focuses on how agents "react to, cope with, or actively appropriate" external structures. These responses of agents are bound or enabled by the cultural schemas which are often rooted in the contradictions of society's structure and habitus of the agent. Agents create broader social narratives practices unique to their specific culture from multiple schemas. The many available to agents schemas woven to a social narrative help to "give society its distinctiveness and coherence" Ortner's agent is "loosely structured", their practice is constituted of how they respond to the schemas 

British Sociologist Anthony Giddens contributed his theory of structuration to practice theory. The premise for structuration is based on his concept of the Duality of Structure. This is the idea that the agency of social actors and structure are inseparable and co-create one another. Agency, according to Giddens, is neither free will or the intentionality of actions, but the capacity of the agent to act. The agency of individuals is constrained and enabled by structure. In turn, structure is created, transformed, and reproduced through the actions of agents. The reinforcing and transformative capacities of agents are Giddens identified two forms of consciousness that inform the knowledgeable agent's actions: practical consciousness and discursive consciousness.

Influenced

Gender Theory

Judith Butler's theory on gender and sex is based on performance and practice theory. In their works Gender Trouble (1990) and "Performative Acts and Gender Constitution" (1988), Butler argues for their concept of gender performativity. Butler argues that all gender and sexual identities are constructs, they are not real or innately natural, these categories do not express any inner reality. Instead gender and sexuality are constituted from performance, the everyday repetition of acts that reaffirm these identities. The individual performs gender and that identity is then validated and accepted by society.

Communities of Practice and Learning as Practice

The work of Jean Lave and Etienne Wenger drew from practice theory to conceptualizes communities of practice and learning. Roddick and Stahl summarize communities of practice as involving "embodied action and continuously renewed relations between understanding and experience, more and less skilled practitioners, and the objects and communities with which practitioners interact."

Communities of practice center the relationship of the agent, the activity engaged in, and community, which are co created and relational to one another. Learning and apprenticeship within practice communities are processes that place individual experience and everyday practice in active discourse with the broader context of their society. According to Wenger and Lave, learning is "situated" through practice of novices and expert practitioners.

Revisions to Practice Theory 
Theodore Schatzki developed an alternative theory of practice, primarily in his books Social Practices (1996) and The Site of the Social (2002). His basic premise, derived from Martin Heidegger and Ludwig Wittgenstein, is that people do what makes sense for them to do. Practices make up people's 'horizon of intelligibility'. In Schatzki's work, practices are defined as 'open-ended spatial-temporal manifolds of actions' (Schatzki, 2005, p. 471) and also as 'sets of hierarchally organized doings/sayings, tasks and projects'  Moreover, practices consist of four main elements: (1) practical understanding – "knowing how to X, knowing how to identify X-ings, and knowing how to prompt as well as respond to X-ings" (idem, p. 77); (2) rules – "explicit formulations, principles, precepts, and instructions that enjoin, direct or remonstrate people to perform specific actions" (idem, p. 79); (3) teleo-affective structure – "a range of normativized and hierarchically ordered ends, projects and tasks, to varying degrees allied with normativized emotions and even mood" (idem, p. 80); and (4) general understanding.

Other important theorists 
William Hanks
Sherry Ortner 
Marshall Sahlins
Andreas Reckwitz
Jean Lave
Davide Nicolini
Elizabeth Shove

Bibliography 

 
 Archer, Margaret S. (2003). Structure, agency and the internal conversation. Cambridge University Press.
 Bourdieu, Pierre [1972] 1977. Outline of a Theory of Practice. Trans. Richard Nice. Cambridge University Press.
 Bourdieu, Pierre ( 1990). The Logic of Practice. Trans. Richard Nice. Polity Press.
 Calhoun, Craig, Edward LiPuma, and Moishe Postone (1993). Bourdieu: critical perspectives. University of Chicago Press.
 de Certeau, Michel (1984). "Foucault and Bourdieu". In The practice of everyday life. Trans. Rendall S. F.University of California Press.
 Giddens, Anthony (1979). Central problems in social theory: Action, structure, and contradiction in social analysis. University of California Press.
 Giddens, Anthony (1984). The Constitution Of Society: Outline Of A Theory Of Structuration. Polity Press.
 Moore, Jerry D.(2000). Visions of culture: An introduction to anthropological theories and theorists. Rowman Altamira.
 Morris, Rosalind C. (1995). "All made up: Performance theory and the new anthropology of sex and gender". Annual review of anthropology. 24 (1): 567–592.
 Nicolini, Davide. Practice theory, work, and organization: An introduction. OUP Oxford, 2012
 
 
Roddick, Andrew P.; Stahl, Anne B. "Introduction: Knowledge in Motion".(2016). Knowledge in motion : constellations of learning across time and place. Ed.Andrew Roddick and Anne P. Stahl. Tucson: The University of Arizona Press.
 Turner, Stephen (1994). The Social Theory of Practices: Tradition, Tacit Knowledge, and Presuppositions. University of Chicago Press.

References

Sociological terminology